Colegrove is a surname that developed in England between the 12th and 15th centuries. The name may have originated from a grove along the River Cole, Wiltshire, a tributary of the River Thames in England. Another explanation as to the origin of the name is from the Middle English cole ‘coal’ + grave ‘pit’, ‘grave’ (Old English col + græf).  Other forms of spelling in the past include ‘Colgrove’, ‘Colegrave’, ‘Colgrave’, ‘Coulgrove’. The first records of the Colegrove name were in 14th century England.

The family name is found throughout the United Kingdom, the United States, Canada, Australia, New Zealand, South Africa, Ireland and other nations.  The first known mention of Colgrove as a surname was of one Johannes Colgrove of Kiddington, Oxfordshire from 1377 during the Poll Tax levied to finance the war against France by John of Gaunt.  Over two hundred years later, there were still people with that surname in Kiddington and the surrounding towns, such as Swalcliffe, Oxfordshire.

There were also place names in England with the name Colegrove.  The earliest mention of which was in a grant of land from one "William de Colethrop" to his son John in Kemerton, Gloucestershire recorded in 1260.  Another place named Colegrave was listed in Northaptonshire records in 1293 in The National Archives of the UK, and later in 1545 in Essex.

The earliest known Colegrove who settled in America was Francis Colegrove who came from England to Rhode Island colony about the year 1683, and from whom descend much of the family in the United States today.

List of persons with the surname
 Francis Colegrove (c. 1667 – c. 1759), colonial immigrant first known Colegrove in the United States
 Jeremiah Colegrove (1756–1838) one of the founders of North Adams, Massachusetts
 Michael Bruce Colegrove, fifth President of Hargrave Military Academy

See also
 Colegrove v. Green, United States Supreme Court case
 Colegrove, Pennsylvania, town founded in the 19th century as a rail depot in McKean County, named after Colegrove founders

References

 Colegrove, William. The History and genealogy of the Colegrove family in America: with biographical sketches, portraits, etc. Napoleon, OH: Genie Publ., 1999. Print. Originally published 1894

 Hanks, Patrick, Richard Coates, Peter McClure, and Paul Cullen. The Oxford dictionary of family names in Britain and Ireland. Oxford, UK: Oxford U Press, 2016. Print. Page 547

 The National Archives of the UK (TNA) website <http://www.nationalarchives.gov.uk>: 40 - Gloucestershire Archives: D214 - The papers of John Parsons, Solicitor, of Kemerton including his family papers: PARISH: HARESCOMBE, STANDISH, FRAMILODE: D214/T30A - STANDISH: D214/T30A/5 - Grant: (1) William de Colethrop to (2) John his son - ½ of all (1)'s tenements as in lands, fields, pastures and flocks...

English-language surnames